Chrudimka is a river in the Pardubice Region in the Czech Republic. It is a left tributary of Labe, beginning near Hlinsko and flowing mostly northward to the city of Pardubice. It is 106.0 km long, and its basin area is 866 km2.

References

Rivers of the Pardubice Region